Silicon monosulfide is a chemical compound of silicon and sulfur. The chemical formula is SiS. Molecular SiS has been detected at high temperature in the gas phase. The gas phase molecule has an Si-S bondlength of 192.93 pm, this compares to the normal single bond length of 216 pm, and is shorter than the Si=S bond length of around 201 pm reported in an organosilanethione. Historically a pale yellow-red amorphous solid compound has been reported. The behavior of silicon can be contrasted with germanium which forms a stable solid monosulfide.

Further reading

References

Inorganic silicon compounds
Sulfides